Nadhirshah is an Indian film director, music composer, singer, lyricist, actor, mimicry artist, comedian, and television host, who works in Malayalam films, television and stage. He has done several supporting roles in Malayalam cinema. His areas of contribution in music includes playback singing, lyrics and composing. He made his directional debut with the Malayalam film Amar Akbar Anthony (2015). His second directorial was Kattappanayile Rithwik Roshan (2016).

Early life
Nadirshah was born in Kochi as the eldest of five children of M.A Sulaiman and P.S Suhara. He did his primary education from FACT Eastern UP School and FACT High School, Eloor, Ernakulam. He pursued his pre-degree from St. Paul’s College, Kalamassery and graduated from Maharaja's College, Ernakulam. He worked at Carborundum Universal, Kochi for a short time.

Career
Nadirshah started his career at the age of 10 when he joined Rajan Antony's SCS Orchestra, Koonamavu

Filmography

As director

As actor

As playback singer
 Ennethedi ...	Maanchiyam	1996
 Manjaadikkunnile Praave ...	Meenakshikkalyaanam	1998
 Aa maalaninakkaanu ...	Korappan The Great	2001
 Vottu nedan ...	Korappan The Great	2001
 Pattananaduvil ...	Korappan The Great	2001
 Peedanam Sthree Peedanam ...	Korappan The Great	2001
 Makkasai ...	Vettam	2004
 Pettayaadi ...	Ben Johnson	2005
 Akkare Ninnoru Jinnu ...	Akkare Ninnoru Sulthan	2007
 Ashakoshale Pennundo ...	Sringaravelan	2013
 Machaane ...	Sringaaravelan	2013
 Premamenthal Enthanu (Reprise) Amar Akbar Anthony 2015

As lyricist
 Aa maalaninakkaanu ...	Korappan The Great	2001
 Vottu nedan ...	Korappan The Great	2001
 Pattananaduvil ...	Korappan The Great	2001	
 Peedanam Sthree Peedanam ...	Korappan The Great	2001
 Makkasai ...	Vettam	2004
 Panchaayathile ...	Pandippada	2005
 Njanoru Raajavaayal ...	Kabadi Kabadi	2008
 Ariyidikubbol ...	The Snake And Ladder	2011	
 Thiruthaali (M) ...	The Snake And Ladder	2011	
 Kandal Njaan Oru Sundarana ...	Sound Thoma	2012
 Aliyaaru Kaakka ...	Nakhangal	2012
 Ashakoshale Pennundo ...	Sringaaravelan	2013	
 Machaane ...	Sringaaravelan	2013
 kannimasam ... Ringmaster 2014
premamennal enthanu.....
Amar Akbar Anyony 2015

As song composer

Television

References

External links

 https://nadhirshah.com/

 Nadir Shah at MSI
 http://www.malayalachalachithram.com/profiles.php?i=926
 http://entertainment.oneindia.in/celebs/nadirsha.html

Indian male film actors
Male actors in Malayalam cinema
Living people
Male actors from Kochi
20th-century Indian male actors
21st-century Indian male actors
Malayalam playback singers
Malayalam-language lyricists
Malayalam comedians
Indian male comedians
Male actors in Malayalam television
Indian male television actors
1966 births